The Duchy or Duke of Rambouillet was a French Peerage created in 1711 for Louis Alexandre de Bourbon, Légitimé de France, Count of Toulouse, youngest legitimised son of Louis XIV and Madame de Montespan.

House of Bourbon

de facto

References and notes

See also
List of French peerages

Dukes of Rambouillet
French titles of nobility